The Mount Gaoligong flying squirrel (Biswamoyopterus gaoligongensis) is a species of large, arboreal flying squirrel endemic to highland forests in southwestern China.

It is the third known member of the highly elusive genus Biswamoyopterus. It was described from two specimens discovered in 2017 and 2018, in the vicinity of Mount Gaoligong in the western Yunnan Province. These specimens were distinct from the other two species in the genus in both coloration and skull shape, indicating that they belonged to a distinct species. This species has also been photographed at two different localities at the eastern and western slopes of Mount Gaoligong. Despite being distantly related, the Mount Gaoligong flying squirrel is easily confused with the more common Yunnan giant flying squirrel; they occur together at Mount Gaoligong.
Due to its restricted distribution and general rarity, it is threatened by human activities such as agriculture and poaching.

References 

Biswamoyopterus
Rodents of China
Endemic fauna of Yunnan
Mammals described in 2019